Andor, also known as Star Wars: Andor, is an American science-fiction action-adventure limited series created by Tony Gilroy for the streaming service Disney+. It is the fourth live-action series in the Star Wars franchise, as well as a prequel to both the spin-off film Rogue One (2016) and the original Star Wars film (1977). The series follows thief-turned-Rebel spy Cassian Andor during the five years that lead to the events of the two aforementioned films.

Diego Luna reprises his role as Cassian Andor and also serves as an executive producer. The ensemble cast also includes Kyle Soller, Adria Arjona, Fiona Shaw, Stellan Skarsgård, Denise Gough, Genevieve O'Reilly, Faye Marsay, Varada Sethu, and Elizabeth Dulau, among others. Lucasfilm announced a series focused on Andor in November 2018, with Luna attached and Stephen Schiff hired as showrunner. Schiff was replaced by Rogue One co-writer Gilroy as creator and showrunner in April 2020. Filming began at the end of November 2020, with Gilroy unable to direct as planned due to the COVID-19 pandemic. Filming took place at Pinewood Studios in London and on location around the United Kingdom, and wrapped by September 2021.

The first season of Andor premiered on Disney+ on September 21, 2022, with three episodes, with the rest of the season's episodes being released weekly through November 23. It received critical acclaim, with praise toward its writing, directing, performances, action sequences, musical score, and the darker, more mature tone compared to previous Star Wars projects. A second season is currently being filmed in London. It will conclude the series, and lead into the events of Rogue One.

Premise 
Beginning five years before the events of Rogue One (2016) and A New Hope (1977), the series follows an ensemble cast of characters during the time that a Rebel Alliance is forming in opposition to the Galactic Empire. One of these characters is Cassian Andor, a thief who becomes a revolutionary and eventually joins the Rebellion.

Cast and characters

Starring 
 Diego Luna as Cassian Andor:A thief and scavenger whose home planet, Kenari, was rendered uninhabitable by a botched Imperial mining project. The series begins with Andor as a "revolution-averse" cynic and explores how he becomes "the most passionate person who's going to give themselves to save the galaxy" in Rogue One. Gilroy had described him as a natural leader who manipulates people, adding that he is "really a perfect kind of spy, warrior, killer." Antonio Viña portrays a young Andor, when he was known as Kassa.
 Kyle Soller as Syril Karn:A Deputy Inspector for Preox-Morlana (Pre-Mor) Authority, a corporate conglomerate in charge of a trade sector. Karn works for Pre-Mor’s security services and is determined to capture Andor after learning he killed two Pre-Mor security employees. Soller described his character as having "an extreme sense of need to impress, and fill a hole in himself. And so that really is about ascending to the top of whatever field he’s in. The field he’s chosen is one of restriction and complete control, and one of domination."
 Adria Arjona as Bix Caleen: A mechanic and black market dealer who is Andor's ally and close friend.
 Fiona Shaw as Maarva Andor: Cassian's adoptive mother who saved him from Kenari with Clem.
 Stellan Skarsgård as Luthen Rael:Caleen's dealer contact who is a part of the Rebel Alliance. He hires Cassian on his first mission as a Rebel operative. Luthen poses publicly as an eccentric antiques dealer from Coruscant.
 Denise Gough as Dedra Meero: An ambitious and strategic supervisor for the Imperial Security Bureau.
 Genevieve O'Reilly as Mon Mothma:A member of the Imperial Senate from the wealthy core world of Chandrila who tries to navigate the politics of the Empire while secretly helping fund the Rebel Alliance.
 Faye Marsay as Vel Sartha: A Rebel leader on the planet Aldhani and Mothma's cousin.
 Varada Sethu as Cinta Kaz: A Rebel on Aldhani who is the team's medic and healer.
 Elizabeth Dulau as Kleya Marki: Luthen's assistant at his antiques store.

Recurring co-stars 
 Joplin Sibtain as Brasso: Andor's co-worker and friend.
 James McArdle as Timm Karlo: Caleen's co-worker and boyfriend.
 Rupert Vansittart as Chief Hyne: Syril's Pre-Mor superior.
 Alex Ferns as Sergeant Linus Mosk: A Pre-Mor officer.
 Gary Beadle as Clem Andor: Maarva's partner and Cassian's adoptive father. Cassian uses his name as an alias.
 Kathryn Hunter as Eedy Karn: Syril's mother.
 Alastair Mackenzie as Perrin Fertha: Mothma's husband.
 Anton Lesser as Major Partagaz: The head Imperial officer at the Imperial Security Bureau.
 Alex Lawther as Karis Nemik: An idealistic Rebel on Aldhani who has written an anti-Empire manifesto.
 Sule Rimi as Lieutenant Gorn: An Imperial officer on Aldhani who is secretly one of Vel's Rebels.
 Ebon Moss-Bachrach as Arvel Skeen: A mysterious Rebel on Aldhani.
 Gershwyn Eustache Jnr as Taramyn Barcona: A Rebel on Aldhani who is a former Stormtrooper.
 Stanley Townsend as Commandant Jayhold Beehaz: Gorn's Imperial superior on Aldhani.
 Ben Miles as Tay Kolma: A banker who is Mothma's childhood friend from whom she seeks help.
 Andy Serkis as Kino Loy: A prisoner and floor manager at the Imperial factory facility on the moon Narkina 5. Serkis previously portrayed Supreme Leader Snoke in the sequel trilogy.
 Duncan Pow as Ruescott Melshi: A labor worker and inmate at the Imperial factory facility on Narkina 5 who will later join the Rebel Alliance alongside Andor. Pow reprises his role from Rogue One.
 Forest Whitaker as Saw Gerrera: A veteran of the Clone Wars and the leader of a militant insurgent group, the Partisans. Whitaker reprises his role from previous Star Wars media, including Rogue One.
 Richard Dillane as Davo Sculdun: A shady businessman, described by Mon Mothma as a "thug".

Dave Chapman voices Maarva Andor's droid B2EMO. Other residents of Ferrix include Zubin Varla as Xanwan, the head of the transport business on Ferrix and a friend of Andor; Abhin Galeya as Salman Paak, a salvage shop owner who runs the Repaak Salyard; Muhannad Bhaier as Wilmon, Salman's son who also runs the Repaak Salyard; Kieran O'Brien as Pegla, a sentry for Zorby's Western Shiplot, the starship lot on Ferrix; Raymond Anum as Nurchi; Victor Perez as Rashi; Neil Bell as the "Time Grappler" who signals the time in the bell tower by banging his anvil; and Pamela Nomvete as Jezzi, a member of the Daughters of Ferrix. Bronte Carmichael appears as Mothma's daughter Leida. Ben Bailey Smith, Robert Emms, Michael Jenn and Lucy Russell portray Imperial Security supervisors Blevin, Lonni Jung, Lagret and Grandi, respectively.  Other Imperials include Lee Ross as Kloris, Mon Mothma's driver and a spy for Blevin; Jacob James Beswick as Heert, Dedra's attendant; Wilf Scolding as Vanis Tigo, captain of Imperial garrison on Ferrix; Nick Moss as Keysax, Tigo's lieutenant; and Noof Ousellam as Corv. Christopher Fairbank, Clemens Schick, Brian Bovell, Tom Reed, Josef Davies, Rasaq Kukoyi and Mensah Bediako appear as Ulaf, Ham, Jemboc, Taga, Xaul, Birnok and Zinska, respectively, all of whom are prison inmates on Narkina 5.

Additional guest stars include Belle Swarc as Andor's sister Kerri; Lee Boardman and Stephen Wight as Kravas and Verlo, the Pre-Mor officers who are killed by Andor; and Nick Blood as Kimzi, a corporal in Aldhani. David Hayman appears as the Chieftain of the Aldhani natives; and Adrian Rawlins appears as Rhasiv, a prison medic on Narkina 5. Malcolm Sinclair appears as Colonel Wullf Yularen, a character from various Star Wars media, who was previously portrayed by Robert Clarke in A New Hope and voiced by Tom Kane in Star Wars: The Clone Wars and Star Wars Rebels. Sam Witwer provides the uncredited voice of the shoretrooper who arrests Andor on Niamos. The Keredian brothers Dewi and Freedi Pamular are performed by Matt Lyons and Liam Cook, and voiced by Mike Quinn and Damian Farrell respectively. 

Benjamin Bratt was revealed in March 2023 to be joining Season 2 in an undisclosed role.

Episodes

Season 1 (2022)

Season 2 
The second season is planned to consist of 12 episodes. Ariel Kleiman, Janus Metz, and Alonso Ruizpalacios will direct episodes of the second season, with Kleiman directing six episodes.

Production

Development 
Disney CEO Bob Iger announced in November 2017 that Disney and Lucasfilm were developing live-action Star Wars television series for the new streaming service Disney+. One of these series was revealed a year later to be a prequel to the film Rogue One (2016). The series was described as a spy thriller show focused on the character Cassian Andor, with Diego Luna reprising his role from the film. Production was expected to begin in 2019 after Luna completed filming the second season of Narcos: Mexico. Jared Bush originally developed the series, writing a pilot script and series bible for the project.

By the end of November 2018, Stephen Schiff was serving as showrunner and executive producer of the series. Tony Gilroy, who was credited as a co-writer on Rogue One and oversaw extensive reshoots for the film, joined the series by early 2019 when he discussed the first story details with Luna. In July 2019, Rick Famuyiwa was in early talks to direct several episodes after doing the same for the first live-action Star Wars series, The Mandalorian. Gilroy's involvement was revealed that October, when he was set to write the first episode, direct multiple episodes, and work alongside Schiff; Gilroy had officially replaced Schiff as showrunner by April 2020. Six weeks of pre-production for the series had taken place in the United Kingdom by then, but this was halted and production on the series delayed due to the COVID-19 pandemic. Pre-production had begun again by September ahead of a planned filming start the next month. At that time, Gilroy, who is based in New York, chose not to travel to the UK for production on the series due to the pandemic, and was therefore unable to direct the series' first episode. Instead, the UK-based Toby Haynes, who was already "high on the list" of potential directors for the series, was hired to direct the first three episodes. Gilroy would remain executive producer and showrunner. Lucasfilm president Kathleen Kennedy announced the series' title, Andor, in December 2020, along with its 2022 release date. Luna was revealed to be executive producing the series, which was set to consist of 12 episodes. In February 2021, Ben Caron and Susanna White were set as additional directors. Sanne Wohlenberg and Michelle Rejwan also executive produce.

In February 2022, star Stellan Skarsgård indicated that the series would have a second season, with filming for it beginning in late 2022. That April, cinematographer Adriano Goldman said there had originally been plans for the series to last five seasons, but he believed those had changed and it was now expected to last three. At Star Wars Celebration a month later, Lucasfilm confirmed a 12-episode second season. Gilroy explained that the original five-season plan was deemed to be "physically impossible" due to the series' scale, and instead they realized that they could end the series with one more season that led directly into the events of Rogue One.

Writing 
In addition to Gilroy and Schiff, writers for the series include Beau Willimon and Gilroy's brother Dan. Gilroy urged his writing team to put aside their personal reverence and nostalgia for Star Wars, fearing that such an attitude could change their behavior and work. Gilroy wanted the series to be accessible to all viewers, not just Star Wars fans, with the hope that those fans would be able to watch the series with their friends and family who are not interested in the rest of the franchise. Luna expressed his excitement at being able to explore the character of Andor further in the series after the bittersweet experience of making Rogue One, in which the character dies. Since Andor is a prequel to the film, Luna said it was "nice to go into a story [of which] you already know the ending. Now you can [flesh out] the nuances and the layers. I think it's fun to do something that isn't just about getting to the end. It's about delaying that." Luna was able to suggest elements of the character's backstory that he had thought of during the filming of Rogue One, and was grateful that Gilroy made the character a refugee. He explained, "It's the journey of a migrant, which to me is everything I come from. Luna felt that because of this, it was "difficult to find out where he comes from", and felt that Andor wanted to "find the opportunities, the freedom, the chances they don't find where they’re born".

The first season begins five years before Rogue One and tells one year of Andor's story when he first becomes a revolutionary. The next four years are then covered by the second season, which leads directly into the events of the film. Gilroy approached the two seasons as two-halves of a novel and described the show beginning as "a very simple, almost film noir situation for a thief [Andor]. A skeevy kind of guy gets in big trouble, tries to sell something he has to save his ass". Luna said the series was about the building of a revolution, and said it was important to explore "the revolutionary we can become to change things, to stop war, to make this world a livable place" which he felt was relevant to real-world issues. Gilroy stated, "This guy gave his life for the galaxy, right? I mean, he consciously, soberly, without vanity or recognition, sacrificed himself. Who does that?" He wanted to explore that idea in the first season, beginning with Andor "being really revolution-averse, and cynical, and lost, and kind of a mess". The season shows the destruction of Andor's homeworld when he was a boy and is then based on Andor's adopted planet, which becomes radicalized against the Empire.

Luna and Gilroy said the series was also about "how the disenfranchised can stand up to effect change". Co-star Fiona Shaw described Gilroy's political commentary in the scripts as a "great, scurrilous [take] on the Trumpian world", adding that "our world is exploding in different places right now, people's rights are disappearing, and Andor reflects that. [In the show] the Empire is taking over, and it feels like the same thing is happening in reality, too". Meanwhile, Gough has stated that her character arc in the series deals with gender politics, while Gilroy explained that "We have a very, very, very deep dive into the Imperial side of the story". After starting with Andor's story in the first three episodes, the fourth begins to expand the scope of the series to include the rest of its large ensemble cast, such as Rebel leader Mon Mothma, whose path will cross with Andor's in the second season. Gilroy felt Star Wars fans would see Mothma in a new light after watching the series, and added that there were key characters and events in the series that would be different or "more interesting" than fans previously realized: "What you've been told, what's on Wookieepedia... is really all wrong".

Design 
Luke Hull served as production designer on the series, and described it as "very cinematic". Neal Scanlan provided the creature and droid effects after doing the same for all of Disney's Star Wars films, including Rogue One. He said his team was treating the series the same as they did the films, and due to Gilroy's involvement the series would fit within the same "pocket of [Star Wars] history" as Rogue One with a "slightly harder edge" than other Star Wars projects. Scanlan added that unused creatures developed for the films could be brought back for the series, alongside newly created creatures. An outdoor city set, which co-star Adria Arjona estimated to be three to five city blocks long, was built practically for the series.

Casting 
Diego Luna was confirmed to be reprising his role as Cassian Andor from Rogue One with the series' announcement in November 2018. In April 2019, Alan Tudyk was announced as also reprising his Rogue One role of K-2SO. A year later, Stellan Skarsgård, Kyle Soller, Genevieve O'Reilly, and Denise Gough joined the cast. O'Reilly reprises her role of Mon Mothma from Rogue One and other Star Wars media. Adria Arjona joined the cast in August 2020, and Fiona Shaw was revealed to also be appearing in December, when Tudyk was not included in an official cast list. A month later, Tudyk confirmed that he would no longer be appearing in the first season due to Gilroy's story changes but he could appear in potential future seasons. Robert Emms was cast in a supporting role in June 2021, when Skarsgård revealed that Forest Whitaker was reprising his role as Saw Gerrera from Rogue One. In February 2022, David Hayman confirmed that he had a role in the series after being spotted by fans during filming. The first season has over 200 named cast members and over 6,000 extras. Benjamin Bratt joined the cast for Season 2 after being spotted with the crew in Valencia.

Filming 
Filming began in London, England, at the end of November 2020, with the production based at Pinewood Studios. The series was filmed under the working title Pilgrim, and was the first live-action Star Wars series to not make use of the StageCraft digital background technology. This was done because the scripts were more suited to being filmed on locations and large sets, and Luna noted that taking a different filming approach for the series made it similar to Rogue One, whose filming style was distinct from other Star Wars films. Toby Haynes directed the first three episodes, with Ben Caron, Susanna White, and Haynes each directing another "block" of three episodes. Jonathan Freeman and Adriano Goldman served as cinematographers. The series was previously reported to begin filming in 2019, and then June 2020, but was delayed due to the COVID-19 pandemic. Both UK and U.S. COVID-19 protocols were followed on set, including daily temperature checks and tests for COVID-19 three times a week. Filming at Pinewood Studios was expected to end in July 2021.

By late January 2021, a large village set had been built on the grounds of a former quarry in Little Marlow, Buckinghamshire, not far from Pinewood Studios, with filming expected to last there until April. Filming in April also took place at the Coryton Refinery in Corringham, Essex, and in East London at Canary Wharf where the plaza under the bridge to the Elizabeth line station served as the entrance to the Imperial Security Bureau on Coruscant. Canary Wharf had also been a filming location for Rogue One. The concrete walkways of the Barbican Centre were used to represent buildings on Coruscant. Several days of filming occurred in Cleveleys on the Fylde Coast of Lancashire in early May, with the town's promenade and beach area dressed as an alien location, later revealed to be the resort planet of Niamos followed by another several days filming in the disused Winspit quarry in Dorset. Second unit and location filming began for at least a week at the end of May in Black Park, a country park in Buckinghamshire near Pinewood Studios which was also used for filming Disney's Star Wars films. By the end of May, main production on Pilgrim had moved to Glen Tilt in Perthshire, Scotland, and was expected to continue there until late June. Around 500 crewmembers traveled to Oban, Scotland, for filming at the nearby Cruachan Dam. This started by June 18, with sets built around the dam and filming also happening in its tunnels. From June 22 to 24, filming took place at Middle Peak Quarry near Wirksworth, Derbyshire. Production was expected to wrap in mid-2021, and Luna confirmed that it had finished by September 27.

The second season began filming on November 21, 2022, and will last until August 2023, with Gilroy anticipating a year for post-production as with the first season. Episodes will once again be filmed in "blocks" of three episodes at a time, with each block moving the story a year closer to the events of Rogue One. Gilroy stated he would not direct in the second season because of his commitments as showrunner. Ariel Kleiman, Janus Metz, and Alonso Ruizpalacios will direct episodes of the second season, with Kleiman directing six episodes. In March 2023 Season 2 was revealed to be filming in Valencia with director Metz among the cast and crew including actor Benjamin Bratt indicating he had joined the series.

Music 

Gilroy contacted Nicholas Britell about composing for the series in 2020, before filming began so he could compose source music that would be played on set. Gilroy and Britell, who are neighbors in Manhattan, first met for the project in August 2020. Kennedy and Gilroy wanted the series to have a unique sound, and Britell said it would be "orchestral-plus" with a "wide range of sounds" including some that he had created. He added that the large scope of the series meant that "every episode has new demands, new music, and new ideas. It's important that as the story evolves, the music should evolve too." Britell was publicly revealed to be the series' composer in February 2022, and was still working on it that May when he said they had been "working nonstop for months, actually years, at this point". Recording was underway by then at AIR Lyndhurst studios in London, with a full orchestra. Britell was unable to travel to London due to the pandemic, but had a team in place there that also worked with him on other television series.

Marketing 
A sizzle reel featuring behind-the-scenes footage of pre-production and filming was released during Disney's Investors Day presentation in December 2020, when the series' title and cast was officially announced by Kennedy. Gilroy, Luna, and O'Reilly promoted the series at Star Wars Celebration in May 2022, where they revealed the first teaser trailer. The Hollywood Reporter Aaron Couch said it showed the "gritty side" of the Star Wars universe. Daniel Chin of The Ringer felt the series had a unique identity in the Star Wars franchise, with a darker tone, and said the teaser "paints a picture of the formative years of the rebellion against the Empire". Ryan Scott from /Film felt the teaser gave the "most comprehensive view at the show up to this point". He said the series could explore the morality behind the Rebels, writing that while they are usually seen as heroes there is also "much gray area in there to be explored". Writing for CNET, Sean Keane felt the trailer did not give much away but gave an "intriguing taste of the show's espionage tone".

Luna promoted the series and debuted the official trailer on Good Morning America on August 1. Hattie Lindert from The A.V. Club highlighted the action scenes in the trailer, saying "In addition to the epic scale and darker tone, the series also promises intense fight scenes created with limited green screen use" and also noted Gilroy's experience with action films due to his work on the Jason Bourne films.  The Hollywood Reporter James Hibberd enjoyed Andor's increased screen-time in the trailer compared to the teaser, and felt the series was a "welcome scenic change from the company's previous Star Wars shows". At CNN, Scottie Andrew felt it "reveals a bit more about Andor's evolution from common thief to galactic martyr". Luna and Kennedy promoted the series at the 2022 D23 Expo, with CNETs Keane writing "The trailer paints a pretty grim setup for revolutionary fighter Cassian Andor and his pals, as fighting the Empire and row upon row of Stormtroopers looks like a one-way ticket to death". Meanwhile, Colliders Rachel Leishman felt the trailer "gives us a bit more of a look at where the rebellion is and who is fighting back against the Empire" and was excited for the portrayal of the Empire in the series, writing "Seeing these little missions and the feelings that the rebels have towards the Empire feels so perfectly align with what we know about Cassian that this trailer really just has us excited for what is to come with the series".

Release 
Andor premiered on Disney+ on September 21, 2022, with the first three episodes being released. The rest of the 12-episode first season was released weekly, until November 23, 2022. The series previously was expected to debut in 2021, before production was delayed by the COVID-19 pandemic. It was originally set to premiere on August 31 with two episodes. In November 2022, Disney announced that the first two episodes of the first season would air on ABC on November 23, on FX on November 24, and Freeform on November 25, and be available on Hulu from November 23 through December 7. A similar move was to be also replicated across various countries in Europe, including Portugal, Spain, Poland and the Netherlands, with the first two episodes airing on Fox, on November 24 or 25, depending on the country.

The second season will also consist of 12 episodes, with Gilroy expecting it to release in late 2024.

Reception

Audience viewership 

According to Whip Media's viewership tracking app TV Time, Andor was the 2nd most anticipated new television series for September 2022. According to the streaming aggregator JustWatch, Andor was the most streamed television series across all platforms in the United States, during the week of September 25, 2022, the 7th during the week of November 7, 2022, to November 13, 2022, and the 6th during the week of November 14, 2022, to November 20, 2022. According to the streaming aggregator Reelgood, Andor was the most watched program across all platforms during the week of September 28, 2022, the 3rd during the week of October 5, 2022, the 3rd during the week of October 14, 2022, the 7th during the week of October 26, 2022, and the 8th during the week of November 11, 2022.

According to Whip Media, Andor was the 3rd most streamed original series across all platforms in the U.S. during the week of October 16, 2022, the most streamed original series across all platforms in the U.S. during the week of October 23, 2022, the most during the week of October 30, 2022, the most during the week of November 6, 2022, the most during the week of November 13, 2022, the most during the week of November 20, 2022, and the most during the week of November 27, 2022.

Critical response 

The review aggregator website Rotten Tomatoes reported an approval rating of 96% with an average rating of 8.50/10 based on 580 critic reviews. The website's critics consensus reads, "A gritty adventure told from the ground perspective of the Empire's reign, Andor is an exceptionally mature and political entry into the Star Wars mythos – and one of the best yet." Metacritic, which uses a weighted average, assigned a score of 74 out of 100 based on 31 critics, indicating "generally favorable reviews".

In a four star review, The Guardian called Andor "the best Star Wars show since The Mandalorian", while Variety was positive towards Andors departure from other Star Wars projects with a "story of people who have nothing to do with Solos, Skywalkers or Palpatines, but whose lives matter nonetheless".

Andor was critically acclaimed and consistently ranked first in the top ten on numerous publications' "Best of 2022" lists for television series, including that of IGN, Polygon, USA Today, Vulture, and Empire, among others.

Accolades

Notes

References

External links 
 
 
 

2020s American drama television series
2022 American television series debuts
 
Espionage television series
Disney+ original programming
English-language television shows
American prequel television series
Star Wars television series
Live action television shows based on films
Television series by Lucasfilm
Television productions postponed due to the COVID-19 pandemic
Television shows filmed in Scotland
Television shows filmed in England
Television shows shot in London
Works by Tony Gilroy
Television shows filmed at Pinewood Studios